Roland Frei (born 25 March 1948) is a retired Swiss football midfielder and later manager.

References

1948 births
Living people
Swiss men's footballers
FC Frauenfeld players
FC Schaffhausen players
Association football midfielders
Swiss football managers
FC Schaffhausen managers
FC Frauenfeld managers
Sportspeople from Thurgau